Nolletia is a genus of flowering plants in the tribe Astereae within the family Asteraceae. The genus was named in honour of Jean-Antoine Nollet, French clergyman and physicist. 

 Species

 formerly included
see Nicolasia 
 Nolletia costata Klatt - Nicolasia costata (Klatt) Thell.

References

Flora of Africa
Asteraceae genera
Astereae